Narak may refer to:

Places in Iran 
 Naraq, a city in Markazi Province
 Narak, Fars, a village in Nujin Rural District, in the Central District of Farashband County, Fars Province
 Narak, Kohgiluyeh and Boyer-Ahmad, a village in Emamzadeh Jafar Rural District, in the Central District of Gachsaran County, Kohgiluyeh and Boyer-Ahmad Province
 Anarak, Arsanjan or Narak, a village in Khobriz Rural District, in the Central District of Arsanjan County, Fars Province
 Naru, Fars or Narak, a village in Aliabad Rural District, Khafr District, Jahrom County, Fars Province
 Narak-e Qasemi, a village in Jangal Rural District, in the Central District of Fasa County, Fars Province

Other uses 
 Naraka, a Sanskrit word referring to the underworld in Hinduism, Sikhism, Jainism and Buddhism
 Narak language, a language of New Guinea
 Thai language meaning cute